Liu Yan Wai (born 9 July 1989) is a Hong Kong fencer. She competed in the women's individual foil event at the 2018 Asian Games, winning the bronze medal.

References

External links
 

1989 births
Living people
Hong Kong female foil fencers
Place of birth missing (living people)
Asian Games medalists in fencing
Asian Games bronze medalists for Hong Kong
Fencers at the 2018 Asian Games
Medalists at the 2018 Asian Games
21st-century Hong Kong women